Hook is a small village in Wiltshire, England between the town of Royal Wootton Bassett and the village of Purton, just north of the M4 motorway.

The single-track road through the nearby hamlet of Hook Street is used as a 'rat-run' by rush-hour commuters to/from the large town of Swindon.

References

Further reading
 

Villages in Wiltshire